Konstantin Sergeevich Alexeyev (born February 26, 1988) is a Russian professional ice hockey defenceman who is currently an unrestricted free agent. He most recently played for HC Sibir Novosibirsk of the Kontinental Hockey League (KHL).

Playing career
Alexeyev made his Kontinental Hockey League debut playing with HC Sibir Novosibirsk during the inaugural 2008–09 KHL season. After spending the first 11 years of his professional career with Siberia, Alexeyev left as a free agent to sign a two-year deal to continue in the KHL with HC CSKA Moscow on May 1, 2016. In the 2016–17 season, after just 16 games with CSKA, Alexeyev was traded back to original club, Sibir Novosibirsk, on December 9, 2016.

References

External links

1988 births
Living people
HC CSKA Moscow players
HC Sibir Novosibirsk players
Zauralie Kurgan players
Russian ice hockey defencemen
Sibirskie Snaipery players
Sportspeople from Novosibirsk